Mil-OSS, also known as the Military Open Source Software Working Group, is a group that promotes the use and creation of open-source software in the United States Department of Defense. Mil-OSS is considered a working group of Open Source for America.

References

External links
 Mil-OSS web site
 Mil-OSS Google Group

Free and open-source software organizations
Georgia Tech Research Institute